Epacris pilosa is a species of flowering plant in the heath family Ericaceae and is endemic to eastern New South Wales. It is low-lying shrub with weeping, shaggy-hairy branchlets, elliptic to more or less egg-shaped leaves and white or cream-coloured tube-shaped flowers.

Description

Taxonomy and naming
This species was first formally described in 1992 by Ian Telford who gave it the name Rupicola ciliata in the journal Telopea based on plant material collected near Kurrajong Heights in 1989. In 2015, R.K. Crowden moved R. ciliata to the genus Epacris, but since a different species had already been given the name Epacris ciliata (now known as Lysinema ciliatum), Crowden changed tne name Rupicola ciliata to Epacris pilosa in Australian Systematic Botany. The specific epithet (pilosa) refers to the hairy surface of the leaves, "an unusual feature in this genus".

Distribution and habitat
This epacris grows in rock crevices and ledges in the Kurrajong Heights and Bilpin areas and in parts of the Blue Mountains of New South Wales.

References

pilosa
Ericales of Australia
Flora of New South Wales
Plants described in 1992